Richard Fryer may refer to:
 Richard Fryer (politician)
 Richard Fryer (cinematographer)